The Woody Guthrie Center is a public museum and archive located in Tulsa, Oklahoma that is dedicated to the life and legacy of American folk musician and singer-songwriter Woody Guthrie. The Center also contains the archives of folk singer, songwriter, and fellow social activist Phil Ochs.

Description
The Woody Guthrie Center is located at 102 East Reconciliation Way in the Tulsa Arts District.  It features an interactive museum where the public may view musical instruments used by Guthrie, samples of his original artwork, notebooks and lyrics in his own handwriting, and photographs and historical memorabilia that illustrate his life, music, and political activities.  Visitors may also view a short biographical film and listen to samples of his music and that of other artists who were influenced and inspired by Guthrie.  Various folk music events are sponsored by the Center.

The Woody Guthrie Archives, which is the world's largest collection of material relating to Guthrie's life, are housed on-site in a climate-controlled facility that is partially visible through windows from the public museum area.  The archives contain manuscripts, lyrics, correspondence, artwork, scrapbooks, musical recordings, books, and photographs, and are open to researchers by appointment.

History
The Woody Guthrie Center officially opened on April 27, 2013 after the archives were acquired by the Tulsa-based George Kaiser Foundation. Previously, the archives were owned by the Woody Guthrie Foundation, which was headed by Guthrie's daughter, Nora Guthrie.

Phil Ochs archives
In September 2014, Meegan Lee Ochs announced that she was donating the archives of her father, singer-songwriter Phil Ochs, to the Center.  Ochs was heavily influenced by Guthrie, and was a troubadour and social activist in his own right. The donation of notebooks, photographs, videotapes, and other memorabilia is the first collection included in the center from an artist other than Guthrie.

Virtual Reality "Dust Bowl" exhibit
In 2018, the Woody Guthrie Museum announced its plan to host a new program bowl that is intended to offer visitors the opportunity to experience Dust Bowl conditions in the Oklahoma Panhandle during 1934–1938.   While wearing a virtual reality headset, they will sit on a replica of a front porch, watching a dust cloud roll in across the prairie to envelop them. The Dust Bowl inspired a number of Guthrie's musical works, and led him to take up the causes of migrant workers and other people disenfranchised by an ecological disaster.

See also
 List of music museums

Notes

References

External links
 Woody Guthrie Center website

Museums in Tulsa, Oklahoma
Guthrie
Music museums in Oklahoma
Woody Guthrie
Phil Ochs
Museums established in 2013
Music archives in the United States